INS Khadan is a grab dredger built by Goa Shipyard Limited (then a part of Mazagon Dock Limited) for the Indian Navy.
 
It was commissioned on 30 April 1975. 
Its yard number is 1055.

See also

References

1975 ships
Auxiliary ships of the Indian Navy